Professional association football players have released records in the United Kingdom since at least the 1930s, when the Arsenal team issued a now-collectible gramophone disc.  The first such record to achieve commercial success was "Back Home", released by the England national team as part of their build-up to the 1970 FIFA World Cup, at which they would defend the trophy they had won four years earlier.  The single, written by Bill Martin and Phil Coulter, spent 17 weeks in the UK Singles Chart and reached number one on the chart dated 16 May.  England did not qualify for the World Cup again until 1982, but the Scotland national team had hits in 1974 and 1978 with singles released ahead of the World Cup, on the latter occasion teaming up with celebrity fan Rod Stewart.  England topped the charts again in 1990 with the single "World in Motion", recorded in collaboration with the band New Order and remembered for the rap performed by player John Barnes.

From the 1970s onwards, it became a tradition for the two teams which had reached the final of the FA Cup to each release a single as part of the build-up to the match, and several of these reached the top 10.  The songs were often adapted from existing well-known recordings, such as Middlesbrough's 1997 hit "Let's Dance", which added new lyrics to a 1987 song by Chris Rea, and were characterised by their "rowdy, altogether-now" style.  Several different teams recorded songs written by Ivor Novello Award-winning songwriter Tony Hiller.  The first FA Cup final single to reach number one was "Come on You Reds", released in 1994 by Manchester United.  The single, adapted from the song "Burning Bridges" by Status Quo, who also performed on the recording, topped the charts on the weekend of United's victory over Chelsea in the final, but has been described as "so bad it's good".  Although cup final singles have fallen out of fashion in recent years, Cardiff City collaborated with singer James Fox on a single to mark their appearance in the FA Cup final in 2008.  Other clubs, such as Lincoln City, have released singles to raise money in times of financial difficulties.

In addition to the hits scored by teams singing en masse, individual professional players have also made appearances in the charts.  Paul Gascoigne, then of Tottenham Hotspur, achieved the biggest hit by an individual player when he reached Number 2 with the single "Fog on the Tyne (Revisited)" in 1990.  Two other Tottenham players, Glenn Hoddle and Chris Waddle, reached Number 12 in 1987 with the song "Diamond Lights", although the single is now mostly remembered for the dated fashions sported by the duo when they performed the song on Top of the Pops.  Only a very small number of UK hit singles have been recorded by sportsmen other than footballers, including top 20 hits for the England national rugby union team in 1991 and the England national cricket team in 2005.

Hits
The list contains every single recorded by a professional football team or individual player which spent at least one week in the UK top 75.  It does not contain singles recorded in tribute to football teams by existing bands or groups of fans such as the 1975 hit "Viva El Fulham" by Tony Rees and the Cottagers, or other hits with a general football theme such as the four-time number one hit "Three Lions" by David Baddiel, Frank Skinner and The Lightning Seeds.  Where two titles are shown for the same single, this represents a double A-side.

Hits recorded by teams

A.  Chas & Dave performed on this single but were not credited.

B.  Status Quo performed on this single but were not credited.

Hits recorded by individual players

References
General

Specific

Association football culture
Footballers, UK hit singles by, List of
Footballers, UK hit singles by, List of
Hit singles
Sports culture in the United Kingdom